Hugh Rimmer (1881–1926) was an English footballer who played in the Football League for Blackpool.

References

1881 births
1926 deaths
English footballers
Association football defenders
English Football League players
Blackpool F.C. players
Fleetwood Town F.C. players
Nelson F.C. players